The women's 1500 metres event at the 2019 European Athletics U23 Championships was held in Gävle, Sweden, at Gavlehov Stadium Park on 12 and 14 July.

Medalists

Results

Heats
Qualification: First 4 in each heat (Q) and next 4 fastest (q) qualified for the final.

Final

References

1500
1500 metres at the European Athletics U23 Championships